San Elizario is a city in El Paso County, Texas, United States. Its population was 13,603 at the 2010 census. It is part of the El Paso metropolitan statistical area. It lies on the Rio Grande, which forms the border between the United States and Mexico. The city of Socorro adjoins it on the west and the town of Clint lies to the north.

History

La Toma: The Official Act of Possession
In 1598, Don Juan de Oñate, a Spanish nobleman and conquistador born in Zacatecas, Mexico, led a group of 539 colonists and 7,000 head of livestock (including horses, oxen, and cattle) from southern Chihuahua to settle the province of New Mexico. The caravan traveled a northeasterly route for weeks across the desert until it reached the banks of the Rio Grande in the San Elizario area. A mass was held, a blessing of the standard and a celebration. Oñate performed the ceremony of La Toma ("Taking Possession"), in which he claimed the new province for King Philip II of Spain. This is considered to be the "Birth of the American Southwest".

Hacienda de los Tiburcios 
The settlement that became
San Elizario was first established sometime before 1760 as the civilian settlement of Hacienda de los Tiburcios. The hacienda was located along the route of Camino Real de Tierra Adentro southeast of Socorro on the west bank of the Rio Grande.  The hacienda was eventually abandoned by the 1770s.

Presidio San Elzeario 

In 1789, the site of the old hacienda Tiburcios became the new site where the Spaniards relocated a fort called Presidio de San Elzeario. It had originally been established in 1774, located farther south in the El Paso Valley near the site of modern El Porvenir.  It had been moved north to be better able to protect the Camino Real and the towns of to its north, Socorro and Ysleta.

The town that grew up around the presidio took its name San Elzeario, or San Elceario (Spanish for Saint Elzear); Saint Elzéar of Sabran is the Roman Catholic patron saint of soldiers.  After the Americans acquired the town at the end of the Mexican American War, its name was Americanized as San Elizario.

San Elizario 
San Elizario was El Paso County's original county seat.

Salt War

In 1877, a conflict, the Salt War, broke out between the town and a troop of Texas Rangers. The Rangers surrendered and two were massacred by the local population. The perpetrators then fled into Mexico and the town lost much of its status.

Incorporation 
San Elizario was incorporated several times between 1871 and 1911, with another unsuccessful attempt at incorporation made in 1986. On November 5, 2013, San Elizario residents voted to re-incorporate the town, having successfully fought off an attempt by Socorro to annex a portion of it, and San Elizario was officially incorporated when El Paso County Judge Veronica Escobar signed an order of incorporation on November 18, 2013.

On May 10, 2014, Maya Sanchez, who led the push to incorporate San Elizario, was elected mayor by a wide margin over two other candidates, while Leticia Hurtado-Miranda, David Cantu, Miguel Najera, Jr., Rebecca Martinez-Juarez, and George Almanzar were elected to the five city council seats.

Geography

San Elizario is located at  (31.582873, –106.265703), right next to the river.

Demographics

2020 census

As of the 2020 United States census, there were 10,116 people, 2,435 households, and 2,168 families residing in the city.

2000 census
As of the census of 2000, 11,046 people, 2,624 households, and 2,440 families resided in the CDP. The racial makeup of the CDP was 94.34% White, 0.15% African American, 5.55% Native American, 0.01% Asian, 0.01% Pacific Islander, 4.18% from other races, and 0.76% from two or more races. Hispanics or Latinos of any race were 97.88% of the population. Of those 98.88% who identify themselves as Hispanic, 95.02% identify themselves as Mexican, making San Elizario the most Mexican (though not Hispanic, see Mila Doce, Texas) town in the United States.

Of the 2,624 households, 67.3% had children under the age of 18 living with them, 73.8% were married couples living together, 15.2% had a female householder with no husband present, and 7.0% were not families. About 6.3% of all households were made up of individuals, and 2.1% had someone living alone who was 65 years of age or older. The average household size was 4.21 and the average family size was 4.40.

In the CDP, the population was distributed as 42.3% under the age of 18, 11.0% from 18 to 24, 28.6% from 25 to 44, 13.4% from 45 to 64, and 4.7% who were 65 years of age or older. The median age was 22 years. For every 100 females, there were 99.4 males. For every 100 females age 18 and over, there were 94.4 males.

The median income for a household in the CDP was $20,145, and for a family was $20,772. Males had a median income of $16,689 versus $12,648 for females. The per capita income for the CDP was $5,915. About 40.2% of families and 44.5% of the population were below the poverty line, including 51.8% of those under age 18 and 20.3% of those age 65 or over.

Education
San Elizario is served by the San Elizario Independent School District.

San Elizario Chapel
San Elizario Chapel (La Capilla de San Elcear) was never a mission, but it functioned as a presidio chapel. It provided the religious needs of a presidio or outpost of military personnel. The presidio was moved to the present site in 1789, to protect travelers and settlers along the Camino Real (Royal Highway) which ran from Mexico City through Ciudad Juárez, then called "Paso del Norte", to Santa Fe, New Mexico. Its close proximity to the Ysleta and Socorro missions also provided protection for them.

When Mexico became independent from Spain in 1821, the military presence at the presidio decreased. By 1848, the presidio had fallen into ruins. Rebuilding efforts began in 1853, with a small church. This proved inadequate, and the present structure was completed in 1882. The exterior appearance has changed very little since then.

The wedding scene for the movie Fandango (1985) was filmed in the plaza of the San Elizario church.

References

External links
 City of San Elizario
 San Elizario Genealogy and Historical Society
 San Elizario Historic District
 El Paso Mission Trail

Cities in El Paso County, Texas
Butterfield Overland Mail in Texas
San Antonio–El Paso Road
San Antonio–San Diego Mail Line
Cities in Texas
Stagecoach stops in the United States
Populated places established in 2013
San Elizario, Texas